Kuroshiovolva lacanientae is a species of sea snail, a marine gastropod mollusk in the family Ovulidae, the ovulids, cowry allies or false cowries.

Description
The length of the shell attains 29.5 mm.

Distribution
This marine species occurs off the Philippines.

References

 Lorenz, F., 2009. Two new species of Ovulidae from the western Pacific (Gastropoda: Ovulidae). Conchylia 40(3-4): 38-42

External links

Ovulidae
Gastropods described in 2009